Alberto Díaz Ortiz (born April 23, 1994) is a Spanish professional basketball player for Unicaja of the Liga ACB. At a height of 1.91 m (6'3") in shoes, and a weight of 86 kg (190 lbs.), he plays at the point guard position.

Professional career
Díaz started his professional career at Clínicas Rincón, an affiliated team of Unicaja. He played simultaneously with both teams until March 2014, when he was loaned to Bilbao Basket, until the end of the 2013–14 season.

Díaz was loaned again for the next season, this time to Baloncesto Fuenlabrada, a team that finished in the last position of the 2014–15 ACB season.

Finally, in the summer of 2015, he came back to Unicaja, and definitively took a role in the team in the 2015–16 season. In the 2016–17 season, Díaz won the European-wide 2nd-tier level EuroCup, with Unicaja, after beating Valencia Basket in the Finals. Along with winning the EuroCup trophy, Díaz was also named the EuroCup Finals MVP, after he averaged 7.3 points, 3.0 assists, and 1.3 steals, in 21.8 minutes per game, over the three game series.

Diaz signed a four-year contract extension on August 7, 2020.

International career
Díaz took part of the Spain national under-18 basketball team that won the Albert Schweitzer Tournament in 2012.

In July 2014, he won the silver medal at the Under-20 championship played in Greece.

After being cut from the final roster of the Spanish NT for EuroBasket 2022, he rejoined the team at the eleventh hour in the wake of Sergio Llull's injury, eventually being an integral part of the Spanish gold medal run, particularly in terms of providing defensive balance to the team, with averages of 5.7 points, 1.1 rebounds and 1.4 assists. He was praised for his defence on Dennis Schröder in the 4th quarter of the semifinals.

Player profile 
According to Fotis Katsikaris, Díaz "has an incredible mentality as an athlete. He always plays at 110% and does not know how to practice at a slower pace. I think he's one of the best, if not the best, perimeter defenders in Europe".

Achievements
With Unicaja
EuroCup: (1)
2016–17
With Spain
Albert Schweitzer Tournament: (1)
2012

Individual awards 
EuroCup Finals MVP: 2016–17

References

External links
 Alberto Díaz at acb.com 
 Alberto Díaz at draftexpress.com
 Alberto Díaz at eurobasket.com
 Alberto Díaz at euroleaguebasketball.net
 Alberto Díaz at feb.es 
 Alberto Díaz at fiba.com (archive)

1994 births
Living people
Baloncesto Fuenlabrada players
Baloncesto Málaga players
Bilbao Basket players
CB Axarquía players
Liga ACB players
Point guards
Shooting guards
Spanish men's basketball players
Sportspeople from Málaga